Clyde Stonewall Phillips (July 3, 1891 - December 15, 1946)  was an American Thoroughbred racehorse trainer and owner who trained for some of the top owners in the sport including Helen Hay Whitney and her daughter Joan Whitney Payson, the actor/dancer Fred Astaire, William Ziegler Jr. and William R. Coe.  
 
Clyde Phillips got the most important win of his career in 1946 when Fred Astaire's horse Triplicate won the Hollywood Gold Cup.

External links
May 26, 1943 photo of Clyde Phillips at  the Daily Racing Form

References

1891 births
1946 deaths
American horse trainers
Burials at Forest Lawn Memorial Park (Glendale)